Philip Dean is an Australian playwright.

Biography
Dean was born in rural Queensland and is a graduate of the Queensland College of Art and the University of Queensland. He lives in Brisbane.

Plays
Dean's writing for the stage includes Long Gone Lonesome Cowgirls and adaptations of three Nick Earls' novels—48 Shades of Brown, Zigzag Street, and After January.

Awards
Dean is the winner of a Matilda Award for Long Gone Lonesome Cowgirls. In 2002, he won an AWGIE Award.

References

Australian dramatists and playwrights
Year of birth missing (living people)
Living people
Griffith University alumni
University of Queensland alumni